Merrylands, an electoral district of the Legislative Assembly in the Australian state of New South Wales had two incarnations, from 1959 to 1962 and from 1968 to 1988.


Election results

Elections in the 1980s

1984

1981

Elections in the 1970s

1978

1976

1973

1971

Elections in the 1970s

1968

1962 - 1968

Elections in the 1950s

1959

References

New South Wales state electoral results by district